The North Horn Formation is a widespread non-marine sedimentary unit with extensive outcrops exposed in central and eastern Utah.  The formation locally exceeds  in thickness and is characterized by fluvial, lacustrine, and floodplain dominated systems, representing a terrestrial, high energy, depositional environment.  The sediments date from Late Cretaceous (Maastrichtian) to early Paleocene in age and include the K-Pg extinction event boundary; however, this boundary is extremely difficult to locate and there is no strong stratigraphic evidence available that indicates a specific marker bed such as an iridium rich clay layer.  Thus far, the only visible evidence is represented in the form of faunal turnover from dinosaur to mammal-dominated fossil assemblages.  Taxa from the Cretaceous part of the formation include squamates, testudines, choristoderes, crocodyliforms, sharks, bony fishes, amphibians, mammals, dinosaurs, eggshell fragments, trace fossils, mollusks, plant macrofossils, such as wood fragments, and palynomorphs.

Stratigraphy 

The North Horn Formation is a non-marine, stratigraphic unit located in east and central Utah which unconformably overlies the Late Cretaceous Price River Formation west of the San Rafael Swell, and the Tuscher Formation east of the swell. The formation is overlain by the late Paleocene-early Eocene Flagstaff Formation, also called the Flagstaff Limestone. The North Horn type section is located on North Horn Mountain in Emery County, Utah. The North Horn Formation varies greatly in thickness and lithology, representing a time transgressive stratigraphic sequence, which means that the age of the base and top of the formation changes as one moves laterally. West of the San Rafael Swell, near Price Canyon, Utah, the basal contact for the North Horn Formation is Maastrichtian (latest Cretaceous) in age, whereas its base is Paleocene in age on the eastern side of the swell. Some of the most complete sections of the North Horn Formation are exposed west of the San Rafael Swell at North Horn Mountain in which the local stratigraphy sometimes exceeds  in thickness.

Subdivisions 
The formation is divided into three informal units based on broad but distinct lithological characteristics. These units include the lower variegated unit at the base, a middle coal unit (in which the K-Pg boundary is located), and the upper variegated unit at the top. The units themselves are further divided into a total of eight sub-units, or lithofacies, based on facies scale lithological features. A detailed sedimentary study of the North Horn Formation was conducted by Lawton et al. The third unit is the sheet sandstone unit and is composed of sheetlike sandstone beds that are interbedded with gray and carbonaceous siltstones. Some limestone beds are present but are uncommon.

Paleontology 
Characteristic dinosaur taxa include the ceratopsian Torosaurus utahensis, the titanosaurid sauropod Alamosaurus sanjuanensis, and the theropod Tyrannosaurus; however, the most frequently occurring taxon in the Cretaceous strata of the North Horn Formation is the Polyglyphanodont squamate Polyglyphanodon.  Fauna recorded from Paleocene strata within the formation appear to be far more diverse and over 70 different taxa have been identified, including frogs, numerous multituberculate, protoeutherians, periptychids, arctocyonids and phenacodontid mammals, crocodyliforms, choristoderes, trace fossils, and palynomorphs. Marsupial remains similar to Alphadon and Eodelphis have also been found here as well.

Pterodactyloid tracks present at an unnamed site. The specimens are kept at the Dinosaur Tracks Museum, of the University of Colorado at Denver. Bird and dinosaur eggs have also been found at the site, along with unidentified hadrosaur fossils (possibly from Edmontosaurus or Kritosaurus).

Fossil content

See also 
 List of dinosaur-bearing rock formations
 Kaiparowits Formation

References 

Geologic formations of the United States
Fossiliferous stratigraphic units of the United States
Maastrichtian Stage of North America
Danian Stage
Cretaceous–Paleogene boundary
Upper Cretaceous Series of North America
Sandstone formations of the United States
Shale formations of the United States
Siltstone formations
Conglomerate formations
Ooliferous formations
Coal in the United States
Geology of Utah
Landforms of Carbon County, Utah
Landforms of Emery County, Utah